Euriphene mundula, the bright nymph, is a butterfly in the family Nymphalidae. It is found in eastern Nigeria, Cameroon, Bioko, Gabon and the Republic of the Congo. The habitat consists of forests.

Adults are attracted to fermented fruit.

References

Butterflies described in 1910
Taxa named by Karl Grünberg
Euriphene